San Blas de los Sauces is a department of the province of La Rioja (Argentina).

Settlements 

 Alpasinche
 Andolucas
 Cuipán
 Las Talas
 Salicas
 San Blas, La Rioja
 San Blas de los Sauces
 Shaqui
 Suriyaco
 Tuyubil

References 

Departments of La Rioja Province, Argentina